Nina Hagen is a German singer, songwriter and actress. She made her acting debut on the German television series ABC der Liebe in 1974. Subsequently, she appeared in a number of films produced in former East Germany, such as Heiraten weiblich (1975), Heute ist Freitag (1975), Liebesfallen (1976), and Unser stiller Mann (1976). In those film she often appeared alongside her mother and actress Eva-Maria Hagen.

Following her 1976 expatriation from East Germany, Hagen moved to Hamburg when she was invited by independent filmmaker and photographer Juliana Grigorova to travel to London and appear in her short film The Go-Blue Girl (1978). She followed with the role in the Dutch film Cha Cha (1979), in which she appeared alongside Herman Brood and Lene Lovich.

Feature films

Television

Short films

References

External links
 
 

Hagen, Nina
Filmography
Hagen, Nina